Bucks Airport  is a privately owned, public-use airport located three nautical miles (3.5 mi, 5.6 km) northeast of the central business district of Bridgeton, a city in Cumberland County, New Jersey, United States.

Facilities and aircraft 
It has one runway designated 18/36 with a turf surface measuring 1,900 by 150 feet (579 x 46 m).

For the 12-month period ending December 31, 2008, the airport had 1,200 general aviation aircraft operations, an average of 100 per month. At that time there were 21 aircraft based at this airport: 95% single-engine and 5% multi-engine.

Accidents 
There have been 4 non-fatal accidents and one Fatal Accident at Bucks Airport. On September 19, 2022 a father and son were killed when their plane crashed just after taking off from Bucks.

References

External links 
 Bucks Airport (00N) page at New Jersey DOT website
 Aerial photo as of 10 March 1991 from USGS The National Map
 Fatal Accident at 00N 9/19/2022
 Link to NSTB repots

Airports in New Jersey
Bridgeton, New Jersey
Transportation buildings and structures in Cumberland County, New Jersey